Cyperus luteus is a species of sedge that is native to central parts of Africa.

The species was first formally described by the botanist Johann Otto Boeckeler in 1874.

See also 
 List of Cyperus species

References 

luteus
Taxa named by Johann Otto Boeckeler
Plants described in 1874
Flora of Uganda
Flora of Tanzania
Flora of Réunion
Flora of Madagascar
Flora of Mauritius
Flora of the Comoros
Flora of Rwanda
Flora of Malawi
Flora of the Democratic Republic of the Congo
Flora of Kenya
Flora of Gabon
Flora of Cameroon